Nam Byeong-gil (南秉吉, 남병길, 1820–1869, McCune–Reischauer: Nam Pyǒng-kil), also known as Nam Sang-gil (南相吉, 남상길), courtesy name Jasang (字裳, 자상), art name Yugiljae (六一齋, 육일재) or Hyecheon (惠泉, 혜천), was a Korean mathematician and astronomer of the Joseon period. He was a member of the Uiryeong Nam clan. His brother Nam Byeong-cheol (南秉哲) was also a noted astronomer.

His works included:
Siheon giyo
Seonggyeong
Yangdo uidoseol
Chubo cheoprye
Chiljeong bobeop 
Taeyang chulippyo
Seonhak jeongui
Seontaek giyo
Jungseong sinpyo
Chunchu ilsiggo

References

Further reading

19th-century Korean mathematicians
Joseon writers
19th-century Korean writers
19th-century Korean astronomers
1820 births
1869 deaths